Nashid Abdul Qadir (Arabic:ناشد عبد القادر) (born 25 August 1996) born in United Arab Emirates is an Omani  footballer. He currently plays as a defender for Al Urooba.

Career

Dhofar
Nashid Abdul Qadir started his career at Dhofar and is a product of the Dhofar's youth system.

Dibba Al-Fujairah
On 18 September 2018 left Dhofar and signed with Dibba . On 20 September 2018, Nashid made his professional debut for Dibba Al-Fujairah against Emirates Club in the Pro League . landed again with Dibba Al-Fujairah from the UAE Pro League to the UAE First Division League in 2018-19 season.

Al Urooba
On 6 June 2021 left Dibba and signed with Al Urooba.

References

External links
 

1996 births
Living people
Omani footballers
Omani expatriate footballers
Association football defenders
Dhofar Club players
Dibba FC players
Al Urooba Club players
Oman Professional League players
UAE Pro League players
UAE First Division League players
Expatriate footballers in the United Arab Emirates
Omani expatriate sportspeople in the United Arab Emirates
Place of birth missing (living people)